The 2007 Sun Belt Conference football season was an NCAA football season that was played from August 28, 2007, to January 6, 2008. The Sun Belt Conference consisted of 8 football members:  Arkansas State, Florida Atlantic, Florida International, Louisiana-Lafayette, Louisiana-Monroe, Middle Tennessee, North Texas, and Troy. Troy and FAU split the Sun Belt Championship, with FAU playing in the New Orleans Bowl where they defeated Memphis.

References